Gwendoline is a feminine given name.

Gwendoline may also refer to:

Gwendoline, an 1886 opera by Emmanuel Chabrier
Gwendoline (sternwheeler), a sternwheel steamer on the Kootenay River in British Columbia
Gwendoline Steers, a tugboat launched in 1888
Sweet Gwendoline, a character created by fetish artist John Willie
The Perils of Gwendoline in the Land of the Yik-Yak, a 1984 film by Just Jaeckin
St Gwendoline's, churches in Llyswen and Talgarth, Wales
Note: this obscure local saint, though listed in some calendars, may be spurious